Elizabeth Marchant Truswell  (also known as Elizabeth Kemp) is a former Chief Scientist at the Australian Geological Survey Organisation and is known for her application of recycled palynomorph distribution as an indicator of sub-ice geology.

Early life and education
Truswell was born in Kalgoorlie, Western Australia and completed a BSc (Hons) at the University of Western Australia in 1962. In 1963 she received a British Commonwealth Scholarship to undertake a PhD at Cambridge University, UK. She was awarded her PhD in 1966 on the geological history of flowering plants as demonstrated by the pollen record. In 2000, she completed a Visual Arts degree with Honours at the School of Art, Australian National University (ANU), focusing on the role of the artists who accompanied the early explorers to Antarctica.

Career and impact

Research 
Truswell's career has focused on the field of palynology, with a large part devoted to understanding Antarctica's floral history. She developed several novel methods for investigating sub-ice geology via the distribution of recycled pollen spores, leading to her election as a Fellow of the Australian Academy of Science in 1985.

As a postdoctoral researcher at Florida State University, US (1971–1973), Truswell participated in the first Deep Sea Drilling Program (DSDP) voyages to Antarctica, which still holds the record for the furthest south of such drilling. This voyage contributed to a new understanding of the age of the Antarctic ice sheet and the development of an early version of the Antarctic Convergence. She was one of the only women on the voyage, and one of just a handful of women to participate in these early DSDP voyages. She recently published a book about the expedition -  "A Memory of Ice". Subsequent work on Ocean Drilling Program material led her, along with M.K. Macphail, to decipher an unparalleled pollen record from Prydz Bay, revealing the composition of terrestrial plant communities during the earliest stages of ice-cap formation during the Late Eocene preglacial-glacial transition.

Truswell returned to Australia in 1973 to begin a career with the Bureau of Mineral Resources (now Geoscience Australia) holding the position of Chief Research Scientist from 1990 to 1997. During this time her work focused not only on the evolutionary and geological history of the Antarctic continent, but also on the past climatic conditions of Australia and applying the geological record to inform understanding of modern climate change. She was also a member of Australia's Antarctic Advisory Committee (1992–1998) and a board member of the first Antarctic Cooperative Research Centre in Hobart, the Antarctic Climate & Ecosystems Cooperative Research Centre.

Truswell has been involved in several UNESCO projects. Her first involvement was with the UNESCO Earth Science program (1991–1999), which aimed to help young Australian scientists to take part in projects with people from developing countries. Since 2006 she has served on the Australian National Committee for the International Geoscience Co-operation (IGCP), which is part of the UNESCO International Geosciences Programme.

Artwork 
In 2000 Truswell shifted her emphasis towards the interface between science and the arts, with particular reference to Antarctica. During her time as a visiting fellow in the Research School of Earth Sciences at the Australia National University, she undertook a degree in visual arts at the School of Art. Her artworks are held in a number of collections in Australia and Europe, including, in Canberra, at the ANU and at Geoscience Australia. She has exhibited in solo exhibitions at the ANCA Gallery in Canberra, CSIRO Discovery Centre, the Goldfields Regional Gallery, Kalgoorlie, and the ANU School of Art Gallery. Her public outreach has included talks and radio broadcasts (e.g. ABC Radio National, The Science Show), U3A lectures on Art and Science in Early Antarctic Exploration, and published papers in academic and popular literature.

Awards and honours
 Elected to Fellowship, Australian Academy of Science, 1985.
 Elected Fellow, Geological Society of Australia, 2009.

Selected works 
Kemp, Elizabeth M (1978) Tertiary climatic evolution and vegetation history in the southeast Indian Ocean region. Palaeogeography, Palaeoclimatology, Palaeoecology 24: 3,169–208.
Macphail, MK; Alley, NF; Truswell, EM; Sluiter, IRK (1994) 10 Early Tertiary vegetation: evidence from spores and pollen, History of the Australian vegetation: Cretaceous to Recent.189 Cambridge University Press
Galloway, Robert William; Kemp, EM (1977) Late cainozoic environments in Australia. Bureau of Mineral Resources, Geology and Geophysics
Frakes, Lawrence A; Kemp, Elizabeth M (1972) Influence of continental positions on early Tertiary climates. Nature 240: 97–100.

References

External links
 Elizabeth Truswell on Google scholar
 

Australian geologists
Australian Antarctic scientists
1941 births
Living people
People from Kalgoorlie
University of Western Australia alumni
Alumni of the University of Cambridge
Women Antarctic scientists
Fellows of the Australian Academy of Science
20th-century women scientists
21st-century women scientists
Australian women geologists
Australian National University alumni
Scientists from Western Australia